Temnoscelis waddeli is a species of beetle in the family Cerambycidae, and the only species in the genus Temnoscelis. It was described by Chevrolat in 1855.

References

Stenobiini
Beetles described in 1855
Taxa named by Louis Alexandre Auguste Chevrolat